Phantom Lady is a 1942 crime novel written by American author Cornell Woolrich under the pseudonym "William Irish". It is the first novel Woolrich published under the William Irish pseudonym.

Plot introduction 
A man is first accused, and then convicted, of murdering his wife.  As his execution date approaches, his friends and a sympathetic detective frantically search for his alibi, a woman with whom he'd gone to a Broadway show the night of the murder. None of the people who saw them together recall the woman.

Film, TV or theatrical adaptations 
In 1944, the novel was adapted to film, as Phantom Lady.

External links
 

1942 American novels
American detective novels
American novels adapted into films
J. B. Lippincott & Co. books
Novels by Cornell Woolrich
Works published under a pseudonym